Modi (also Mudiya) is a script used to write the Marathi language, which is the primary language spoken in the state of Maharashtra, India. There are multiple theories concerning its origin. The Modi script was used alongside the Devanagari script to write Marathi until the 20th century when the Balbodh style of the Devanagari script was promoted as the standard writing system for Marathi.

Etymology 
The name 'Modi' perhaps derives from the Marathi verb moḍaṇe (Marathi: मोडणे), which means "to bend or break". Modi is believed to be derived from broken Devanagari characters, which lends support to that particular etymology. It is not to be confused with the name Modi.

Origin theories

Hemāḍpant origin theory 

Hemāḍpant was a minister during the reign of Mahadeva (ruled 1261–1271) and the initial years of the reign of Rāmachandra (ruled 1271 to 1309)  of the Yadava Dynasty.

Creation subtheory 
Hemāḍpant created the Modi script.

Refinement subtheory 
The Modi script already existed in the 13th century. It was refined and introduced as an official script for Marathi by Hemāḍpant.

Sri Lanka subtheory 
Hemāḍpant brought the Modi script to India from Sri Lanka.

Bāḷājī Avajī Chitnis origin theory 

Bāḷājī Avajī Chitnis was the secretary of state to the Maratha king Shivaji Maharaj (ruled 1642–1680). He was also a high-ranking minister in the Durbar  of Chhatrapati Shivaji Maharaj. Bāḷājī Avajī created the Modi script.

History 
There are various styles of the Modi script associated with a particular era. Many changes occurred in each era

Proto-Modi 
The proto-Modi style, or ādyakālīn (आद्यकालीन), style appears in the 12th century.

Yādav Era 
The Yadav Era style, or yādavkālīn (यादव कालीन), emerged as a distinct style in the 13th century during the Yādav Dynasty.

Bahamanī Era 
The Bahamanī Era style, or bahamanīkālīn (बहमनी कालीन), appeared in the 14th–16th centuries during the Bahmani Sultanate.

Shiva Era 
In Shiva Era, or shivakālīn (शिव कालीन), which was during the 17th century, the Chitnisi style of the Modi script developed.

Peshwa Era 
In the Peshwa Era, or peshvekālīn (पेशवे कालीन), various Modi styles proliferated during the Maratha Empire and lasted until 1818. The distinct styles of Modi used during this period are Chitnisi, Bilavalkari, Mahadevapanti, and Ranadi. Even though all of these were quite popular, Chitnisi was the most prominant and frequently used script of Modi writing.

British Colonial  Era 
The British Colonial era, or the ānglakālīn (आंग्ल कालीन),  is the final stage of the Modi script. It is associated with British rule and was used from 1818 to 1952.  On 25 July 1917, the Bombay Presidency decided to replace the Modi script with the Balbodh style of Devnagari as the primary script of administration for the sake of convenience and uniformity with the other areas of the presidency. The Modi script continued to be taught in schools until several decades later and continued to be used as an alternate script to the Balbodh style of Devnagari. The script was still widely used up until the 1940s by the people of older generation for personal and financial uses.

Post-independence Era 

The use of Modi has diminished since the independence of India. Now the Balbodh style of Devnagari is the primary script used to write Marathi. Some linguists in Pune have recently begun trying to revive the script.

Description

Overview 
The Modi script derives from the Nāgari family of scripts and is a modification of the Balbodh style of the Devanagari script intended for continuous writing. Although Modi is based upon Devanagari, it differs considerably from it in terms of letter forms, rendering behaviors, and orthography. The shapes of some consonants, vowels, and vowel signs are similar. The actual differences are visible in the behaviors of these characters in certain environments, such as consonant-vowel combinations and in consonant conjuncts, that are standard features of Modi orthography. The Modi script has 46 distinctive letters, of which 36 are consonants and 10 vowels.

Cursive features 
The Modi script has several characteristics facilitate writing so that moving from one character to the next minimises lifting the pen from the paper for dipping in ink. Some characters are "broken" versions of their Devanagari counterparts. Many characters are more "circular" in shape. Thus, Modi was a sort of "cursive" style of writing Marathi. The Modi script does not have long 'ī' (ई) and long 'ū' (ऊ) of Devanagari. The cursive nature of the script also allowed scribes to easily make multiple copies of a document if required.

Features of the letters 
There are numerous modifications that are made to the Modi script in writing as "shortcuts," reflecting its history as a quasi-shorthand form of Devanagari.

The consonants fall into three broad categories: 1) Those that always retain their isolated form and attach their dependent vowel forms in a way common to most Indic scripts; 2) Those that take on a "contextual" form and change their form only in the presence of a dependent vowel immediately after, in which case those vowel forms are attached to the contextual form of the consonant in a uniform way as done with the consonants in Category 1 and with most other Indic alphabets; and 3) Those that form ligatures in the presence of vowel following the consonants. The ligatures are generally determined by the shape of the consonant and the presence of a loop on the right.

Regarding conjuncts, as in Devanagari, ksha and tra have special conjuncts, while other consonants typically occupy half forms or contextual forms. The letter ra is special, as it can take different visual positions as the first consonant in a conjunct cluster depending on whether it is palatalized or not. As the second consonant in a cluster, however, it functions almost identically to Devanagari.

Alternative forms of the letter ra are also used to make multisyllabic clusters involving ra. This is seen in kara, tara, sara, and a few others as a subjoined ra to the bottom right of a letter, and in joining at the end of other syllables, it is seen with a curved head. Following dependent vowel signs like -aa and punctuation marks like dandas, the ra also joins underneath, and any additional vowel marks are written directly on top of the subjoined ra.

Modi also has an empty circle that indicates abbreviations, which also may have been borrowed by Goykanadi, used for writing Konkani, which is closely related to Marathi.

Headstroke 
The headstroke in Modi is unlike Devanagari in that it is typically written before the letters are, in order to produce a "ruled page" for writing Modi in lines. Thus, there are no word boundaries that can be visibly seen, since the headstroke doesn't break between words.

Usage 
The Modi script was frequently used as a shorthand script for swift writing in business and administration. Modi was used primarily by administrative people as well as businessmen in keeping their accounts and writing Hundis (credit notes). Modi was also used to encrypt the message since not all people were well versed in reading this script.

Printing and typing

Printing 
Before printing in Marathi was possible, the Modi script was used for writing prose and Balbodh was used for writing poetry. When printing in Marathi became possible, choosing between Modi and Balbodh was a problem. William Carey published the first book on Marathi grammar in 1805 using Balbodh since printing in the Modi script was not available to him in Serampore, Bengal. At the time Marathi books were generally written in Balbodh. However, in subsequent editions of William Carey's book on Marathi grammar, starting in 1810, were written in the Modi script. Using offset printing machines, previously Lithography printing was in vogue.

Typing 

Most Modi fonts are clip fonts. Some well known Modi clip fonts are 'kotem1' developed by Ashok Kothare, 'Hemadree' developed by Somesh Bartakke, 'ModiGhate' developed by Sameer Ghate and 'Modi Khilari' developed by Rajesh Khilari. Among these fonts, 'Hemadree' and 'Modi Khilari' are currently available. Some other fonts for Modi use Devanagari Unicode Block to render Modi characters. The Modi script was included in Unicode for the first time in version 7.0. This inclusion has recently led to development of Unicode fonts for Modi, such as MarathiCursive and Noto Sans Modi. Also, a Unicode keyboard layout for Modi, named 'Modi (KaGaPa Phonetic)', has been recently added in the XKB keyboard stack, which is mainly used in Linux based operating systems. The character mapping of this keyboard layout is similar to the existing 'Marathi (KaGaPa Phonetic)' layout, but uses Modi's dedicated Unicode block for typing.

Documents in the Modi script 
Most documents in Modi are handwritten. The oldest document in the Modi script is from 1389 and is preserved at the Bhārat Itihās Sanshodhan Mandal (BISM) in Pune. The majority of documents and correspondence from before Shivaji Raje Bhonsle's times are written in the Modi script.

Unicode

The Modi alphabet (U+11600–U+1165F) was added to the Unicode Standard in June 2014 with the release of version 7.0.

See also
Balbodh
Clip font
Cursive

References

External links
 MarathiCursiveG — free Modi Unicode font
 Modi at Omniglot
 Modi at Ancient Scripts
 Website about the Modi script
 Website for learning the Modi script

Brahmic scripts
Marathi language